Pat Foy (born 1 January 1965) is  a former Australian rules footballer who played with Sydney in the Victorian Football League (VFL).

Notes

External links 		
		
		
		
		
		
		
Living people		
1965 births		
		
Australian rules footballers from Victoria (Australia)		
Sydney Swans players